The hot spring  are a nationally designated "Place of Scenic Beauty" in the onsen town of Beppu, Ōita, Japan. The "hells" are for viewing rather than bathing.

See also
 Beppu Onsen

References

External links

 Beppu Jigoku Trail 
 Map of Hells and Hot Springs of Beppu
 Photographs of the Hells of Beppu
Travel Itinerary for best experiencing Beppu Jigoku

Places of Scenic Beauty
Hot springs of Japan
Tourist attractions in Ōita Prefecture
Geography of Ōita Prefecture